Ronni Hansen (born 30 June 1988) is a Danish professional football midfielder.

External links
Lyngby BK profile
Career statistics at Danmarks Radio

References 

1988 births
Living people
Danish men's footballers
Lyngby Boldklub players
Danish Superliga players

Association football midfielders